= Ranquil River =

River in Chile

Ranquil River (Spanish: Río Ránquil) is a stream of the Biobío Region of Chile.
